Saproscincus challengeri, also known commonly as the Border Ranges shadeskink, Challenger's skink, the challenging shade skink, and the orange-tailed shadeskink, is a species of lizard in the family Scincidae. The species is native to New South Wales and Queensland in Australia.

Etymology
George Albert Boulenger, herpetologist at the British Museum (Natural History) named S. challengeri after the Challenger expedition in 1887.

Habitat

Reproduction
S. challengeri is oviparous.

References

Further reading
Boulenger GA (1887). Catalogue of the Lizards in the British Museum (Natural History). Second Edition. Volume III. Lacertidæ, Gerrhosauridæ, Scincidæ, Anelytropidæ, Dibamidæ, Chamæleontidæ. London: Trustees of the British Museum (Natural History). (Taylor and Francis, printers). xii + 575 pp. + Plates I–XL. (Lygosoma challengeri, new species, p. 268 + Plate XIX, figures 3, 3a).
Cogger HG (2014). Reptiles and Amphibians of Australia, Seventh Edition. Clayton, Victoria, Australia: CSIRO Publishing. xxx + 1,033 pp. .
Greer AE (1974). "The genetic relationships of the Scincid lizard genus Leiolopisma and its relatives". Australian Journal of Zoology Supplemental Series 22 (31): 1–67. (Lampropholis challengeri, new combination, p. 21).
Sadlier RA, Colgan DJ, Shea GM (1993). "Taxonomy and distribution of the scincid lizard Saproscincus challengeri and related species in southeastern Australia". Memoirs of the Queensland Museum 34 (1): 139–158. (Saproscincus challengeri, new combination).
Wilson S, Swan G (2013). A Complete Guide to Reptiles of Australia, Fourth Edition. Sydney: New Holland Publishers. 522 pp. .

Saproscincus
Reptiles described in 1887
Skinks of Australia
Endemic fauna of Australia
Taxa named by George Albert Boulenger